The 2001 Big South Conference men's basketball tournament took place March 1–3, 2001, at the Roanoke Civic Center in Roanoke, Virginia. For the third consecutive year, the tournament was won by the Winthrop Eagles, led by head coach Gregg Marshall.

Format
Six teams participated in the tournament, hosted at the Roanoke Civic Center. Teams were seeded by conference winning percentage. As part of their transitional phase, conference members Elon and High Point were ineligible for the tournament.

Bracket

* Asterisk indicates overtime game
Source

All-Tournament Team
Andrey Savtchenko, Radford
Tyrone Walker, Winthrop
Derrick Knox, Winthrop
Jason Williams, Radford
Chris Caldwell, Liberty

References

Tournament
Big South Conference men's basketball tournament
Big South Conference men's basketball tournament
Big South Conference men's basketball tournament